WCXT (98.3 FM, "The Coast") is a radio station broadcasting an adult contemporary format, serving the southwestern Michigan area. WCXT is licensed to Hartford, Michigan and focuses on the cities of St. Joseph, Benton Harbor and South Haven. The station broadcasts in HD on 98.3-HD1 and is owned by Mid-West Family Broadcasting (WSJM, Inc.)

It was announced on January 7, 2008 that the station would move from the 94.9 FM frequency to 98.3 FM, which had previously been the home of WCSY-FM and briefly WSJM-FM. The satellite-fed smooth jazz programming from Jones Radio Networks (now owned by Dial-Global) that was part of WCSY-FM's "Cosy-FM" AC format continued after the move to 98.3 MHz. In 2009, the smooth jazz programming was dropped in favor of a live and local night show featuring the station's daytime format of Hot AC.

The call letters were changed once again on February 8, 2008 from the 94.9 FM transferred WCNF to WCXT when the heritage call letters became available. The WCXT calls were used for many years on the 105.3 FM frequency in Hart, Michigan, which is now WHTS licensed to Coopersville and serving the Grand Rapids market.

Veteran air personalities Phil McDonald and Robin Van Dyke continue to broadcast at the station as the only two remaining personalities from the 94.9 The Coast era. Zack East, a former air personality on sister station WIRX and also at Big Rapids stations WYBR, WWBR and WBRN, hosts a music-intensive morning show on the station.

References
Michiguide.com – WCXT History
98.3 The Coast Website

External links

CXT
Mainstream adult contemporary radio stations in the United States
Radio stations established in 1998